Karen van Rijn is a Dutch former cricketer who played as a wicket-keeper. She appeared for Netherlands in nine One Day Internationals between 1989 and 1991. She scored 70 runs with a high score of 20 not out and took four catches.

References

External links
 
 

Living people
Dutch women cricketers
Netherlands women One Day International cricketers
Date of birth missing (living people)
Year of birth missing (living people)
Place of birth missing (living people)